The men's javelin throw event at the 2009 Asian Athletics Championships was held at the Guangdong Olympic Stadium on November 14.

Results

References
Results

2009 Asian Athletics Championships
Javelin throw at the Asian Athletics Championships